Bossiaea disticha is a species of flowering plant in the family Fabaceae and is endemic to the far southwest of Western Australia. It is a weak, slender shrub with oblong to egg-shaped leaves and bright yellow and red flowers.

Description

Taxonomy and naming
Bossiaea disticha was first formally described in 1841 by John Lindley in Edwards's Botanical Register. Lindley described it as "A pretty little shrub, raised in the garden of the Horticultural Society from Swan River seed, presented by Capt. James Mangles R.N. and flowering in March". The specific epithet (disticha) means "in two rows", referring to the leaves.

Distribution and habitat
This bossiaea is common in the understorey of forest, woodland and heath from near Ellen Brook in the north to Cape Leeuwin, in the Jarrah Forest and Warren biogeographic regions of far south-western Western Australia.

Conservation status
Bossiaea disticha is classified as "not threatened" by the Government of Western Australia Department of Parks and Wildlife.

References

disticha
Eudicots of Western Australia
Plants described in 1841
Taxa named by John Lindley